St. Mary's Secondary School (Charleville) is a secondary school located in Charleville, County Cork, Republic of Ireland.

External links
St. Mary's Charleville Website

Secondary schools in County Cork